The 2018 Liberty Bowl was a college football bowl game between the #24 Missouri Tigers of the Southeastern Conference and the unranked Oklahoma State Cowboys of the Big 12 Conference. The 60th edition of the Liberty Bowl took place on December 31, 2018 at 2:45 p.m. EST and aired on ESPN.  It was one of the 2018–19 bowl games that concluded the 2018 FBS football season. Liberty Bowl Memorial Stadium in Memphis, Tennessee, hosted the game for the 54th straight year.  The game was sponsored by automobile parts and accessories store AutoZone and was officially known as the AutoZone Liberty Bowl.

The Cowboys beat the Tigers by a score of 38–33 to claim the school's first Liberty Bowl championship and their 19th bowl game overall.

Teams
The game was played between Missouri from the Southeastern Conference (SEC) and Oklahoma State from the Big 12 Conference. The two programs had previously met 52 times, with Missouri holding a 29–23 series lead. Both programs were members of the Big Eight Conference for many years, and met annually from 1960 through 1997; their most recent prior meeting had been the 2014 Cotton Bowl Classic, won by Missouri.

Missouri Tigers

Missouri received and accepted a bid to the Liberty Bowl on December 2. The Tigers entered their third Liberty Bowl with an 8–4 record (4–4 in conference).

Oklahoma State Cowboys

Oklahoma State received and accepted a bid to the Liberty Bowl on December 2. The Cowboys entered the bowl with a 6–6 record (3–6 in conference).

Game summary

Scoring summary

Statistics

References

External links

Box score at ESPN

Liberty Bowl
Liberty Bowl
Liberty Bowl
Liberty Bowl
Missouri Tigers football bowl games
Oklahoma State Cowboys football bowl games